Frank Butler (February 18, 1928 – July 24, 1984) was an American jazz drummer.

Early life
Butler was born in Kansas City, Missouri, but later moved west and was associated in large part with the West Coast school. He played the drums in multiple high school bands (including one in Omaha, Nebraska), in local jazz combos, and in USO shows during World War II.

Career
Butler never became well known, but was highly regarded by fellow musicians (in 1958, veteran drummer Jo Jones proclaimed him "the greatest drummer in the world") and performed with numerous jazz notables. Early in his career he played with the Dave Brubeck combo at a 1950 engagement in San Francisco, before Brubeck's group gained a national following in the mid-1950s. He went on to perform and record with Duke Ellington, John Coltrane, Miles Davis, Ben Webster, Harold Land, Hampton Hawes and Art Pepper in the 1950s and 1960s. He performed on several television series, including Stars of Jazz with bassist Curtis Counce. The Contemporary label noticed Butler and Counce, and, from 1956 through 1958, captured them together on several Curtis Counce Quintet albums. Sidelined for many years by an addiction to heroin, Butler did not record albums under his own name until the 1970s, when he released two highly regarded albums titled Wheelin' and Dealin' and The Stepper.

Death
Butler died in Ventura, California after a short battle with lung cancer at the age of 56.

Discography

As leader
The Stepper (Xanadu, 1977)
Wheelin' and Dealin' (Xanadu, 1978)

As co-leader
Co-led with Curtis Amy
Groovin' Blue (Pacific Jazz, 1961)

As sideman
With Dolo Coker
Dolo! (Xanadu, 1976)
California Hard (Xanadu, 1976)
Third Down (Xanadu, 1977)
With Joyce Collins
Girl Here Plays Mean Piano (Jazzland, 1961)
With John Coltrane
Kulu Sé Mama (Impulse, 1967)
With Curtis Counce
The Curtis Counce Group (Contemporary, 1956)
You Get More Bounce with Curtis Counce! (Contemporary, 1957)
Carl's Blues (Contemporary, 1957)
Sonority (Contemporary, 1957-8 [1989])
Exploring the Future (Dooto, 1958)
With Miles Davis
Seven Steps to Heaven (Columbia, 1963)
With Kenny Drew
Home Is Where the Soul Is (Xanadu, 1978)
For Sure! (Xanadu, 1978)
With Teddy Edwards
Feelin's (Muse, 1974)
With Victor Feldman
Soviet Jazz Themes (Äva, 1962)
With Red Garland
Red Alert (Galaxy, 1977)
With Hampton Hawes
For Real! (Contemporary, 1958 [1961])
Bird Song (Contemporary, 1958 [1999])
With Elmo Hope
The Elmo Hope Quintet featuring Harold Land (Pacific Jazz, 1957)
Elmo Hope Trio (Hifijazz, 1959)
With Helen Humes
Helen Humes (Contemporary, 1960)
Swingin' with Humes (Contemporary, 1961)
With Fred Katz
Fred Katz and his Jammers (Decca, 1959)
With Harold Land
Harold in the Land of Jazz (Contemporary, 1958)
The Fox (Hifijazz, 1959)
With Big Miller
Revelations and the Blues (Columbia, 1961)
With Red Mitchell
Rejoice! (Pacific Jazz, 1961)
With Paul Moer
The Contemporary Jazz Classics of the Paul Moer Trio (Del-Fi, 1959)
With Phineas Newborn
The Newborn Touch (Contemporary, 1964)
With Art Pepper
Smack Up (Contemporary, 1960)
Intensity (Contemporary, 1960)
Among Friends (Interplay, 1978)
With Ben Webster
Ben Webster at the Renaissance (Contemporary, 1960 [1985])
With Gerald Wilson 
Everywhere (Pacific Jazz, 1968)
With Jimmy Witherspoon 
In Blues (Society, 1964)
With Xanadu All Stars
Xanadu in Africa (Xanadu, 1980) with Al Cohn, Billy Mitchell and Leroy Vinnegar
Night Flight to Dakar (Xanadu, 1980) with Al Cohn, Billy Mitchell and Leroy Vinnegar

Notes

References

External links
 
 

American jazz drummers
West Coast jazz drummers
1928 births
1984 deaths
Musicians from Kansas City, Missouri
Xanadu Records artists
20th-century American drummers
American male drummers
Jazz musicians from Missouri
20th-century American male musicians
American male jazz musicians